Kamal-Hanna Bathish (born on 6 December 1931 in Nazareth, Mandatory Palestine) is a Palestinian Catholic prelate who served as auxiliary bishop of the Latin Patriarch of Jerusalem from 1993 to 2007.

Life
Kamal-Hanna Bathish received in 1955 his ordination to the priesthood. In 1993 he was appointed a bishop by Pope John Paul II. Bathish was appointed Titular Bishop of Aurusuliana and appointed auxiliary bishop of the Latin Patriarchate of Jerusalem. He received his episcopal consecration on July 3, 1993, by the Patriarch of Jerusalem, Michel Sabbah and were his co-consecrators Salim Sayegh (Catholic bishop) and Guerino Dominique Picchi. On October 29, 1994, Kamal Hanna Bathish was appointed Titular Bishop of Ierichus. He continued to work in Jerusalem as a bishop until his retirement on 9 June 2007.

External links

http://www.catholic-hierarchy.org/bishop/bbathish.html

1931 births
Living people
20th-century Roman Catholic bishops in Israel
21st-century Roman Catholic bishops in Israel
Arab citizens of Israel
Israeli Arab Christians
Palestinian Roman Catholic bishops
People from Nazareth